Antonella Ragno-Lonzi (born 6 June 1940) is an Italian fencer and Olympic champion in foil competition.

Biography
She received a gold medal in foil at the 1972 Summer Olympics in Munich and a bronze at the 1960 and 1964 Summer Olympics. She is married to Gianni Lonzi, Italy's 1960 Olympic gold medalist in the men's water polo.

See also
Italian sportswomen multiple medalists at Olympics and World Championships

References

External links
 Fencer profile at Amova web site
 
 
 

1940 births
Living people
Italian female fencers
Olympic fencers of Italy
Fencers at the 1960 Summer Olympics
Fencers at the 1964 Summer Olympics
Fencers at the 1968 Summer Olympics
Fencers at the 1972 Summer Olympics
Olympic gold medalists for Italy
Olympic bronze medalists for Italy
Olympic medalists in fencing
Medalists at the 1960 Summer Olympics
Medalists at the 1964 Summer Olympics
Medalists at the 1972 Summer Olympics
20th-century Italian women
21st-century Italian women